Lorengau Urban LLG is a local-level government (LLG) of Manus Province, Papua New Guinea.

Wards
80. Lorengau Urban

References

Local-level governments of Manus Province